Phenylacetyl-CoA 1,2-epoxidase (ring 1,2-phenylacetyl-CoA epoxidase, phenylacetyl-CoA monooxygenase, PaaAC, PaaABC(D)E) is an enzyme with systematic name phenylacetyl-CoA:oxygen oxidoreductase (1,2-epoxidizing). This enzyme catalyses the following chemical reaction

 phenylacetyl-CoA + NADPH + H+ + O2  2-(1,2-epoxy-1,2-dihydrophenyl)acetyl-CoA + NADP+ + H2O

Phenylacetyl-CoA 1,2-epoxidase participates in catabolism of phenylacetate in Escherichia coli and Pseudomonas putida.

References

External links 
 

EC 1.14.13